Correio da Manhã TV (CMTV) is a private Portuguese generalist channel, with a strong focus on news. It is operated by Cofina, owner of Correio da Manhã, a notable Portuguese tabloid and the most read newspaper in Portugal. It is available in basic fiber and satellite. The channel launched in March 2013 as an exclusive in Portugal to MEO. The channel is accused of being sensationalist, as well as its parent newspaper.

CMTV aims to expand to other platforms as the exclusivity contract expires. Despite this, it reached the top 30 channels in Portugal and expanded to Angola and Mozambique in 2014.

In late 2015 CMTV reached an agreement with NOS to be available in this subscription TV provider from 14 January 2016. With this agreement CMTV reached over 80% of the paid TV subscribers in Portugal.

The channel is the 5th most watched in Portugal.

The channel has been available in Canada since late June 2017 (Bell Fibe TV/Bell). 

CMTV at the end of April 2022 lost one of the channel's journalist, died with 27 years old victim from a motorbike accident, while she was on the way to somewhere to make a live section .

References

24-hour television news channels in Portugal
Television channels and stations established in 2013
Portuguese-language television stations